The 1970 All-Big Ten Conference football team consists of American football players chosen by various organizations for All-Big Ten Conference teams for the 1970 Big Ten Conference football season. The teams selected by the Big Ten coaches for the United Press International (UPI) were dominated by the 1970 Michigan Wolverines football team with 10 first-team selections and the 1970 Ohio State Buckeyes football team with six first-team selections.

Offensive selections

Quarterbacks
 Don Moorhead, Michigan (AP-1; UPI-1)
 Rex Kern, Ohio State (AP-2; UPI-2)

Halfbacks

 Mike Adamle, Northwestern (AP-1; UPI-1)
 Billy Taylor, Michigan (AP-2; UPI-2)
 Levi Mitchell, Iowa (AP-2)
 Eric Allen, Michigan State (UPI-2)
 Leo Hayden, Ohio State (UPI-2)

Fullbacks
 John Brockington, Ohio State (AP-1; UPI-1)
 Barry Mayer, Minnesota (UPI-2)

Tight ends

 Doug Dieken, Illinois (AP-2 [end]; UPI-1)
 Jan White, Ohio State (UPI-2)

Split ends
 Paul Staroba, Michigan (AP-1 [end]; UPI-1)
 Larry Mialik, Wisconsin (AP-1 [end])
 Gordon Bowdell, Michigan State (AP-2 [end]; UPI-2)

Flankers
 Barry Pearson, Northwestern (AP-1)
 Stan Brown, Purdue (AP-2)

Tackles
 Dan Dierdorf, Michigan (AP-1; UPI-1)
 John Rodman, Northwestern (AP-1; UPI-2)
 Dave Cheney, Ohio State (UPI-1)
 Jack Harpring, Michigan (AP-2)
 John Muller, Iowa (AP-2)
 Donnie Green, Purdue (UPI-2)

Guards
 Mike Sikich, Northwestern (AP-1; UPI-1)
 Reggie McKenzie, Michigan (AP-2; UPI-1)
 Phil Strickland, Ohio State (AP-1; UPI-2)
 Joe DeLamielleure, Michigan State (AP-2)
 Alvin Hawes, Minnesota (UPI-2)

Centers

 Tom DeLeone, Ohio State (AP-1)
 Guy Murdock, Michigan (UPI-1 [tie])
 Joe Zigulich, Northwestern (UPI-1 [tie])
 Tom Beard, Michigan (AP-2)

Defensive selections

Ends
 Phil Seymour, Michigan (AP-1; UPI-1) 
 Bill Gregory, Wisconsin (AP-1; UPI-1 [def. tackle])
 Mark Debevc, Ohio State (AP-2; UPI-1)
 Ed Maguire, Indiana (AP-2)
 Mike Keller, Michigan (UPI-2)
 Layne McDowell, Iowa (UPI-2)

Tackles
 Pete Newell, Michigan (AP-1; UPI-1)
 James DeLisle, Wisconsin (AP-2; UPI-2)
 Jim Anderson, Northwestern (AP-2)
 George Hazenohrl, Ohio State (UPI-2)

Middle guards
 Henry Hill, Michigan (AP-1 [def. tackle]; UPI-1 [tie])
 Jim Stillwagon, Ohio State (AP-1 [linebacker]; UPI-1 [tie])

Linebackers
 Chuck Winfrey, Wisconsin (AP-1; UPI-1) 
 Bill Light, Minnesota (AP-1; UPI-2)
 Marty Huff, Michigan (AP-2; UPI-1)
 Douglas Adams, Ohio State (AP-2; UPI-2)
 Jim Teal, Purdue (AP-20

Defensive backs
 Eric Hutchinson, Northwestern (AP-1; UPI-1)
 Mike Sensibaugh, Ohio State (AP-1 [safety]; UPI-1)
 Jack Tatum, Ohio State (AP-1; UPI-1)
 Jeff Wright, Minnesota (AP-1; UPI-2)
 Thom Darden, Michigan (UPI-1)
 Randy Cooper, Purdue (AP-2; UPI-2)
 Tim Anderson, Ohio State (AP-2)
 Walt Bowser, Minnesota (AP-2 [safety])
 Rick Telander, Northwestern (AP-2)
 Jim Betts, Michigan (UPI-2)
 Craig Clemons, Iowa (UPI-2)

Key
AP = Associated Press

UPI = United Press International, selected by the Big Ten Conference coaches

Bold = Consensus first-team selection by both AP and UPI

See also
1970 College Football All-America Team

References

All-Big Ten Conference
All-Big Ten Conference football teams